Alfred Thomas "Fred" Davis (March 26, 1868 – July 24, 1945) was a farmer and a politician on the federal and provincial level in Canada. He was born in 1868 in Mitchell, Ontario to William J. Davis and Tabitha Worth. He married Margaret Davidson in 1898.

Political career
Davis first began his political career as a municipal councilor in his home town of Mitchell, Ontario. He later became the towns Mayor.

Davis ran for a seat in the Legislative Assembly of Alberta in the 1917 Alberta general election as a Conservative. He defeated Liberal incumbent John Peter McArthur and former Governor of Kansas John Leedy in a hotly contested election.

Davis served one term in the Alberta Legislature before retiring from provincial politics in 1921.

Davis ran for the House of Commons of Canada in the 1925 Canadian federal election. He defeated incumbent Member of Parliament William Irvine. Davis was defeated a year later by Herbert Adshead in the 1926 Canadian federal election.

He died in Calgary after a long illness in 1945 and was buried in his hometown of Mitchell, Ontario.

References

External links

 

1868 births
1945 deaths
Progressive Conservative Association of Alberta MLAs
Members of the House of Commons of Canada from Alberta
Conservative Party of Canada (1867–1942) MPs